Jovel may refer to:

 San Cristóbal de las Casas, city in Chiapas, Mexico
 Carlos Francisco Jovel Navas (born 1982), Salvadoran footballer
 José Francisco Jovel (born 1951), Salvadoran footballer